The 2009–10 Essex Senior Football League season was the 39th in the history of Essex Senior Football League a football competition in England. Stansted won the league, but were not promoted due to ground grading requirements. The League Cup and the Gordon Brasted Memorial Trophy were both won by Bethnal Green United.

League table

The league featured 15 clubs which competed in the league last season, along with three new clubs:
Bethnal Green United, promoted from the Middlesex County League
Tiptree United, transferred from the Eastern Counties League
Witham Town, relegated from the Isthmian League

Also, Mauritius Sports & Pennant changed name to Mauritius Sports Association.

League table

References

Essex Senior Football League seasons
9